Cheriyan Kandi Muhammad Koya (15 July 1927–28 September 1983) was an Indian politician who served as the 8th Chief Minister of Kerala from October to December 1979. He is more often noted for being the Minister of Education of Kerala from 1967 to 1973 and again from 1977 to 1979. After his Chief Ministership, Koya went on to become the 2nd Deputy Chief Minister of Kerala from 1981 until his death in 1983. He is the first Indian Union Muslim League member to lead a state in independent India. 

As the Minister of Education, Koya championed the progress of the education of backward classes in northern Kerala. He also served as the Home Minister (1969–73) and the Deputy Chief Minister of Kerala (1981–83).

Life and career 

Cheriyan Kandi Muhammad Koya was born in 1927 at Atholi in northern Kerala, to Payampunathil Ali and Mariyumma. Koya floated the Muslim Students Federation, the youth wing of the All-India Muslim League, in Malabar District while he was at Zamorin's College, Calicut and later helped to organize an admirable reception for the prominent Muslim League leader Liaquat Ali Khan at Calicut (1945). He joined the Chandrika newspaper, the official organ of the Muslim League, in 1946.

Koya was first elected to the Kerala Assembly in the 1957 legislative elections. He went on to hold several key Kerala cabinet posts (Minister for Education, Deputy Chief Minister, Home Minister, and Minister for Finance). He served under both Indian National Congress and Communist Party of India Chief Ministers (E. M. S. Namboodiripad, C. Achutha Menon, K. Karunakaran, A. K. Antony, and P. K. Vasudevan Nair). He was elected to the Lok Sabha in the 1962 (1962–67) and in 1973 (1973–77, by-elections, replacing recently deceased M. Muhammed Ismail). 

He was a Member in the Kerala University Senate and served as Chairman, Governing Body, REC, Calicut.

Koya died on 28 September, 1983 while serving as the Deputy Chief Minister of Kerala. He was aged just 56 at the time of his death.

Legacy 

Koya was known his eloquent oratory and was described by scholar R. E. Miller as "grassroots star of the Mappila community" and the "ranking hero of Muslim youth" in Kerala. He acted as a "bridge-builder" among various social and religious groups of Kerala. Koya is remembered for his "spirited" reply to Jawaharlal Nehru, the then Prime Minister of India when the latter publicly criticized Indian Union Muslim League as "a dead horse" at Calicut (1955). 

As the Minister of Education, Koya championed the progress of the Mappila community in secular education. During Koya's tenure as the Minister of Education, the University of Calicut was established in northern Kerala. He also advocated higher standards in the 'Arabic Colleges'.

Member of Kerala Legislative Assembly 
Source: Kerala Legislative Assembly (profile)
1st Assembly (1957–59) – Tanur
2nd Assembly (1960–64) – Tanur (resigned on 6 March 1962)
3rd Assembly (1967–70) – Mankada
4th Assembly (1970–77) – Kondotty (resigned on 5 February 1973)
5th Assembly (1977–79) – Malappuram
6th Assembly (1980–82) – Manjeri
7th Assembly (1982–87) – Manjeri (died on 28 September, 1983)

In Kerala council of ministers

Works 
Source: Kerala Legislative Assembly (profile)
 My Haj pilgrimage
 Caux-London-Cairo
The Malaysia I Saw
 How Legislative Assembly Works
Soviet Union
Muslim Rule in India Through Stories
 Five Days in Sri Lanka
 Camel to Cadillac
Travel Around the World

Notes

References

Further reading

External links

C. H. Mohammad Koya: Interview with India Today (1979)
C. H. Mohammed Koya in Louis Malle's Phantom India 

Koya, C.H. Mohammed
Koya, C.H. Mohammed
Chief Ministers of Kerala
Malayali politicians
Kerala politicians
Politicians from Kozhikode
Speakers of the Kerala Legislative Assembly
Malayalam-language writers
Indian Union Muslim League politicians
India MPs 1962–1967
Lok Sabha members from Kerala
Deputy chief ministers of Kerala
Kerala MLAs 1957–1959
Kerala MLAs 1960–1964
Education Ministers of Kerala